José María Moreno is a station on Line E of the Buenos Aires Underground. The station was opened on 23 June 1973 as the western terminus of a one station extension from Avenida La Plata. On 7 October 1985, the line was extended to Emilio Mitre.

References

External links

Buenos Aires Underground stations